The Burnelli RB-1 was a US twin engine biplane airliner prototype from 1920, incorporating a lifting body fuselage.

Design and development
The Burnelli RB-1, often known as the Remington-Burnelli Airliner, was an American passenger biplane from 1920, designed by Vincent Burnelli. It incorporated Burnelli's lifting-body design. Following several more conventional designs during the WWI years, Burnelli came up with the idea of a lifting body: an airfoil-shaped fuselage that could be used to generate up to 50% of the lift, improving performance, due to reduced wing area and fuel consumption.

The RB-1's body contributed about 27% of the total lifting area and was designed to support about 15% of its weight.  The fuselage was built around plywood frames and was clad in corrugated duralumin.  The two pilots were situated in a pair of open cockpits, each with a mechanic seated by his side.  Its pair of Liberty engines were immediately in front of these cockpits, largely buried in the leading edge of the body but accessible from the cockpits. The body width of 14 ft (4.27 m) placed the engines only 10 ft 4 in (3.15 m) apart, with about 1 in (25 mm) clearance between propeller tips.  The cabin housed up to 30 passengers.  At the fixed "trailing edge" of the fuselage small twin fins mounted above its sides carried balanced rudders and short, mid-fuselage mounted tailplanes carried balanced elevators.

It was a single bay equal span biplane, with simple parallel interplane struts and without stagger.  The wings were wooden structures, fabric covered.  The ailerons carried on both upper and lower wings had prominent tip balances.

The RB-1 flew for the first time on 21 June 1921 from Curtiss Field, Long Island, piloted by Bert Acosta and William P. Sullivan.  Its performance was considered acceptable. However, the first model produced was badly damaged while on the ground during a storm.

Burnelli RB-2 

The Burnelli RB-2 was a 1920s American twin-engined biplane freighter or airliner, designed by Vincent Burnelli with a lifting body fuselage. At the time it was the world's largest commercial freighter. It was the first aircraft to carry a motor car inside its fuselage.

Design and development
The RB-2 was based on the earlier RB-1 airliner, it had improved control surfaces and was powered by two 650 hp Galloway Atlantic piston engines. It had a corrugated metal construction with a dural skin giving it an empty weight of 5 tons. The passenger cabin could be fitted with 25 seats or used for freight.

In 1925 the aircraft was used by the Hudson Motor Car Company as a flying showroom for the Essex automobile.

Specifications

Notes

References

1920s United States civil aircraft
Lifting bodies
RB-1
Biplanes
Twin piston-engined tractor aircraft
Aircraft first flown in 1921